William Morison (1843–1937) was a Scottish presbyterian minister, writer and biographer. He was born in Moffat, Dumfries and Galloway. His father was Alexander Moffat, a master builder. and his mother was Catherine Campbell. He was educated at Moffat Academy, the University of Edinburgh where he graduated M.A. in 1862, and at the United Presbyterian College, Edinburgh. He married Anne Primrose Douglas on 24 March 1869. They had three daughters – Annie, Catherine and Helen. He died on 9 March 1937 at his home at Corstorphine, Edinburgh.

Career as minister 
 1863 –  Licensed by U. P. Presbytery of Annandale, Scottish Borders.
 1882-3 – Assistant at Dumbarton Bridgend
 1883-4 – Assistant at Dumfries Buccleuch Street
 29 Apr 1868 –  Ordained and inducted as Minister at Leeds U. P. Church.
 6 Sep 1870 – Transferred to Pendleton.
 26 June 1877 – Transferred to Leith St. Andrews.
 28 Dec 1880 – Transferred to and inducted at Rosehall, Edinburgh.
 1914 – Retired from ministry.

Publications 
 Andrew Melville. Edinburgh: Oliphant, Anderson and Ferrier, 1899, ("Famous Scots Series")
 Johnston of Warriston. Edinburgh: Oliphant, Anderson and Ferrier, 1901, ("Famous Scots Series")
 Milton and Liberty. Edinburgh & London: William Green and Sons, 1909

Sources 
 The Fasti of the United Free Church of Scotland, 1900-1929. Edited by the Rev. John Alexander Lamb. Edinburgh and London: Oliver & Boyd, 1956. p. 26.
 Scotlandspeople internet site: www.scotlandspeople.gov.uk.
 www.ancestry.com

References

External links
 
 

1843 births
1937 deaths
People from Moffat
Scottish biographers
Scottish non-fiction writers
Alumni of the University of Edinburgh
Ministers of the United Presbyterian Church (Scotland)
Ministers of the United Free Church of Scotland